This is a list of feature films with appearances by the Looney Tunes characters, either centered on that series or just cameo roles only.

Compilation films 
All directed by Friz Freleng except where noted. All on DVD except where noted.

Original films

Theatrical releases

Direct-to-video films 
All titles below are available on DVD.

Television films

Theatrical cameos of Looney Tunes characters

Direct-to-video cameos of Looney Tunes characters 
All titles below are available on DVD.

 This film combines live-action with animation.
 This film is an adult animated production.
 This film was released theatrically and on HBO Max the same day.

Box office

See also 
 Looney Tunes and Merrie Melodies filmography
 Looney Tunes
 Merrie Melodies
 Looney Tunes Golden Collection
 List of Looney Tunes television series

References

Further reading 
 Looney Tunes and Merrie Melodies: A Complete Illustrated Guide to the Warner Bros. Cartoons, by Jerry Beck and Will Friedwald (1989), Henry Holt, 
 Chuck Amuck : The Life and Times of an Animated Cartoonist by Chuck Jones, published by Farrar Straus & Giroux, 
 That's Not All, Folks! by Mel Blanc, Philip Bashe. Warner Books,  (Softcover)  (Hardcover)
 Of Mice and Magic: A History of American Animated Cartoons, Leonard Maltin, Revised Edition 1987, Plume  (Softcover)  (Hardcover)

External links 
 The Big Cartoon DataBase entry for Merrie Melodies Cartoons and for Looney Tunes Cartoons
 Golden Age Cartoons' The Ultimate Looney Tunes and Merrie Melodies Website by Jon Cooke
 "Warner Brothers Cartoon Companion", a wealth of trivia about the Warner cartoons
 Official site

 
Looney Tunes and Merrie Melodies
American animated films
Lists of films by franchise